The North Fork Eel River is the smallest of four major tributaries of the Eel River in northwestern California in the United States. Very few people inhabit the relatively pristine watershed of the river; there are no operational stream gauges and only one bridge (Mina Road) that crosses the river, near the boundary between Trinity and  Mendocino Counties.

Course
It is formed in southern Trinity County deep within the Six Rivers National Forest by the confluence of its East and West Forks. The East Fork, the larger of the two, is sometimes considered the main stem. The river flows south-southeast through the North Fork Wilderness of the national forest, receiving Red Mountain and Hulls Creeks, both from the left. After the Hulls Creek confluence it turns west then south through a gorge into Mendocino County.

Watershed
Primary human usage of the basin include very limited farming, ranching, grazing and logging. A study conducted in 1996 reported that the North Fork Eel River basin has only 200 full-time residents. About 50 percent of the land is government-owned, 48% are private, and 2% belongs to the Round Valley Indian Reservation. Recreational uses, such as hunting and boating, are more common. For rafting, the North Fork Eel River is considered a very "difficult" river, shallow and fluctuating highly in flow, with Class IV and III rapids decreasing in size closer to the mouth.

Ecology
The river historically was abundant with steelhead trout, and supported two distinct runs, one in the winter and one in the spring. The total historic population was estimated at 6,930 fish. Coho salmon might also have been present. However, logging and resultant severe erosion caused by the storms in 1964 caused hillsides to slump into the river near the mouth, filling its channel with debris and large boulders. The heavy flows also created several waterfalls that pose barriers to migrating fish, and the average temperature of the river was raised, reducing habitat quality.

Wilderness
Established in 1984, the North Fork Wilderness comprises 8,158 acres and is managed by the U.S. Forest Service.  This wilderness area encompasses the entire watershed of the North Fork Eel River.  Centered around a mixed conifer lined gorge, the area is home to a significant population of black-tailed deer.

See also
Middle Fork Eel River
South Fork Eel River
List of rivers of California
List of U.S. Wilderness Areas

References

Rivers of Trinity County, California
Rivers of Mendocino County, California
Rivers of Northern California
Tributaries of the Eel River (California)
Wilderness areas of California
Wild and Scenic Rivers of the United States